Bácskai Friss Újság (lit. Bachkan Fresh News) was a Hungarian language daily newspaper. It was founded in 1901, with the purpose of serving as the information source for the Magyars and Hungarian language-speaking population in Bács-Bodrog County within the Kingdom of Hungary in Austria-Hungary. It was published in Subotica (Today in Serbia). Its editors were Imre Dugovich and János Kovács. Bácskai Friss Újság was disestablished that same year.

See also
 Bácskai Újság (1899)
 Bácskai Újság (1935)
 Hungarians in Vojvodina

External links
 (Hungarian) Kosztolányi Dezső emlékoldal - Bácskai lapok.1 Sajtótörténeti háttér a Forrásjegyzék 2. kötetéhez
 (Hungarian) Születésnapi Újság, születésnapi újságok, régi újság minta ajándék ...
 (Hungarian) Szabadka városfejlődése 1700 és 1910 között
 (Hungarian) LÉTÜNK - TÁRSADALOM, TUDOMÁNY, KULTÚRA, 2002.1-2

References

Defunct newspapers published in Serbia
History of Subotica
Hungarian-language newspapers
Newspapers established in 1901
Publications disestablished in 1901